Research is a suburb of Melbourne, Victoria, Australia,  north-east from Melbourne's Central Business District, located within the Shire of Nillumbik local government area. Research recorded a population of 2,695 at the 2021 census.

History

Settled in the 1850s, Research was the location of extensive orchards by the 1860s. The unusual name arose from the gold rush era in Victoria, during the mid 19th century. Research was then known as Swiper's Gully, but gold was found after the area was re-searched. Swiper's Gully then became Research Gully, and finally, late in the 19th century, abbreviated to Research.

Research Post Office opened on 20 October 1902.

Community

Much of Research today consists of 1- to 35-acre blocks.  This area has one of the highest bushfire risks in Australia, due to prolific Eucalyptus and Melaleuca Paperbark trees.  Consequently, a diverse variety of fauna and flora exist in this ecologically protected zone.

Research has a variety of facilities, including the Research Football Club, Scout Hall, Tennis Club, Research CFA, Eltham Little Theatre, Balance Gymnastics Club, Eltham Martial Arts Gym and Micky's Fitness Gym.

The nearest public library is Eltham Library, operated by Yarra Plenty Regional Library.

Education

The schools in Research include Eltham College of Education and Research Primary School. Eltham College comprises both a junior and senior school.

Eltham College of Education and Research Primary are both situated on Main Road.

Sport

Research is the home of the Research Junior Football Club, which competes in the Northern Football League. They play their home games at Research Park, located on Main Road, Research. Research Cricket Club and Eltham Collegians Cricket Club were both Diamond Valley Cricket Association teams based in Research, until they merged in 2010 to form one club. Their home games are played at Research Park and Eltham College Oval and Ben Davies made 50* and took 4 wickets in 2021. Research Baseball Club, which plays in the Melbourne Winter Baseball League, are based in Research, but play their home games in Lower Plenty. Research Tennis Club play their home games at the Research Park Tennis Courts.

See also
 Shire of Eltham – Research was previously within this former local government area.

References

Suburbs of Melbourne
Suburbs of the Shire of Nillumbik